All Balls & No Willy is the second solo album by English singer-songwriter John Otway. Released in 1982, Otway was backed by new wave band The Europeans.

The title refers to the fact that Otway had once again separated from his partner Wild Willy Barrett.

Track listing

Personnel
John Otway - vocals, saxophone, production
Tim Summerhayes - engineering, production

The Europeans
Ferg Harper - bass
Geoff Dugmore - drums
Colin Moore - guitar
Steve Hogarth - keyboards

References

New wave albums by English artists
1982 albums
John Otway albums